Julius Caesar (billed on-screen as William Shakespeare's Julius Caesar) is a 1953 American film adaptation of the Shakespearean play, directed by Joseph L. Mankiewicz and produced by John Houseman for Metro-Goldwyn-Mayer. It stars Marlon Brando as Mark Antony, James Mason as Brutus, John Gielgud as Cassius, Louis Calhern as Caesar, Edmond O'Brien as Casca,  Greer Garson as Calpurnia, and Deborah Kerr as Portia.

The film opened to positive reviews, and was nominated in five categories at the 26th Academy Awards (including Best Picture and Best Actor for Brando), winning Best Art Direction - Black-and-White. Brando and Gielgud both won BAFTA Awards, Brando for Best Foreign Actor and Gielgud for Best British Actor.

Plot

"Upon Caesar's return to Rome, after defeating Pompey in the civil war, his countrymen chose him a fourth time consul and then dictator for life. . . thus he became odious to moderate men through the extravagance of the titles and powers that were heaped upon him."Plutarch's Lives
The film is a largely-faithful adaptation of Shakespeare's play, with no significant cuts or alterations to the original text. The only notable exception is the Messenger's text recounting the Battle of Philippi, which is substituted with a visual depiction of the battle.

Cast

Cast as listed in end credits

Production
Producer John Houseman says the film was made because Laurence Olivier's 1944 production of Henry V had been a success. MGM's head of production Dore Schary offered the project to Houseman, who said he wanted Joseph L. Mankiewicz to direct because he thought he and William Wyler were "probably the two best dialogue directors in the business" and that Mankiewicz was "younger and more flexible."

Houseman did not want to use an all-British cast. "I'd done a lot of Shakespeare in America," he said. "If it was going to be cast all-English, it should be an English picture, made in England and we might as well forget about it."

Houseman says MGM wanted to make the film in color but he and Mankiewicz refused, "partly because we wanted people to relate to the newsreels, to the Fascist movements in Europe, which were still relevant" and also because they would be "using a lot of the Quo Vadis sets, and it seemed idiotic to invite comparison with Quo Vadis."

Though Houseman originally intended to shoot the film in Italy, production ultimately took place in Los Angeles instead. Many of the sets and costumes were repurposed from Quo Vadis (1951), with several setpieces deconstructed, flown from Rome to California, and rebuilt on MGM's Culver City studio backlot.

Houseman says they "decided to do it as a small production, not a spectacle; to do it for what it really is—the drama of a political power play."

Casting

Many actors in this film had experience in the play. John Gielgud had played Mark Antony at the Old Vic Theatre in 1930 and Cassius at the Shakespeare Memorial Theatre in Stratford-upon-Avon in 1950, James Mason had played Brutus at the Abbey Theatre in Dublin in the 1940s, and John Hoyt, who plays Decius Brutus, also played him in the Mercury Theatre's 1937 stage version. Gielgud later played the title role in the 1970 film with Charlton Heston, Jason Robards and Richard Johnson (as Cassius) and in a stage production directed by John Schlesinger at the Royal National Theatre. John Houseman, who had produced the famous 1937 Broadway version of the play starring Orson Welles and the Mercury Theatre, also produced the MGM film. By this time, however, Welles and Houseman had had a falling out, and Welles had nothing to do with the 1953 film. P. M. Pasinetti, Italian-American writer, scholar, and teacher at UCLA served as a technical advisor.

Brando's casting was met with some skepticism when it was announced, as he had acquired the nickname of "The Mumbler" following his performance in A Streetcar Named Desire (1951).  Director Joseph L. Mankiewicz even considered Paul Scofield for the role of Mark Antony if Brando's screen test was unsuccessful.  Brando asked John Gielgud for advice in declaiming Shakespeare, and adopted all of Gielgud's recommendations. Brando's performance turned out so well that the New York Times''' Bosley Crowther stated in his review of the film: “Happily, Mr. Brando's diction, which has been guttural and slurred in previous films, is clear and precise in this instance. In him a major talent has emerged.”  Brando was so dedicated in his performance during shooting that Gielgud offered to direct him in a stage production of Hamlet, a proposition that Brando seriously considered but ultimately turned down.  During filming, James Mason became concerned that Brando was stealing the audience's sympathy away from him and his character, Brutus, so Mason appealed to Mankiewicz, with whom he had bonded earlier while making the film 5 Fingers, requesting that the director stop Brando from dominating the film and "put the focus back where it belongs. Namely on me!"  The subsequent shift in directorial attention didn't escape Brando, who threatened to walk off the film if Mankiewicz "threw one more scene to Mason", alleging a ménage à trois  among Mankiewicz, Mason and his wife Pamela Mason.  Despite the feuding, production continued with only minimal disruption, thanks to what Gielgud called, "Mankiewicz's consummate tact that kept us together as a working unit."

O. Z. Whitehead is listed on the Internet Movie Database as having played Cinna the Poet in the film and not receiving screen credit, but his one scene was deleted before release, and it is not included in any DVD or video releases of the film. (However, Cinna the Conspirator does appear — he is played by actor William Cottrell.)

Release
The film premiered at the Booth Theatre in New York City on June 3, 1953.

Reception
Critical response
The film received highly favorable reviews. Bosley Crowther of The New York Times called it "a stirring and memorable film," while Variety wrote: "A triumphant achievement in film-making, it will be rated one of the great pictures of Hollywood." Harrison's Reports raved, "Excellent! Sumptuously produced, expertly directed and brilliantly acted, 'Julius Caesar' is an artistic triumph that ranks with the best of the Shakespearean plays that have been put on film." John McCarten of The New Yorker called the film "a very chilly exercise" and opined that Brando "plainly shows he needs a bit of speech training before he can graduate into an acting league where the spoken word is a trifle more significant than the flexed biceps and the fixed eye," but praised Mason and Gielgud as "a pleasure to watch and listen to." The Monthly Film Bulletin called it "an excellent film, excellent cinema, excellent entertainment, and pretty respectable art."

In the second volume of his book The Story of Cinema, author David Shipman pointed to Gielgud "negotiating the verse as in no other Shakespeare film to date except Olivier's". On Rotten Tomatoes the film has an approval rating of 95% based on reviews from 22 critics.

The film is recognized by American Film Institute in these lists:
 2008: AFI's 10 Top 10:
 Nominated Epic Film

Box office
According to MGM records, the film earned $2,021,000 in the U.S. and Canada and $1,899,000 in other markets, resulting in a profit of $116,000.

In 1976, Houseman said "It's still shown a lot—in theaters and schools and on TV. I suspect it finally made more money than any other picture I made."

Awards and nominations
The film won the Academy Award for Best Art Direction (Cedric Gibbons, Edward Carfagno, Edwin B. Willis, Hugh Hunt), and was nominated for Best Actor in a Leading Role (Marlon Brando), Best Cinematography, Black-and-White, Best Music, Scoring of a Dramatic or Comedy Picture and Best Picture. Brando's nomination was his third consecutive for Best Actor, following 1951's A Streetcar Named Desire and 1952's Viva Zapata!. He would win the following year for On the Waterfront.Julius Caesar won BAFTA awards for Best British Actor (John Gielgud) and Best Foreign Actor (Marlon Brando), and was also nominated for Best Film. It was Brando's second of three consecutive BAFTA Best Actor awards, for Viva Zapata! (1952), Julius Caesar (1953),  and On the Waterfront (1954).

The National Board of Review awarded Julius Caesar Best Film and Best Actor (James Mason), and it also won the Golden Leopard at the Locarno International Film Festival.

Soundtrack
Intrada Records released an album featuring a 1995 re-recording of Miklós Rózsa’s film score. The re-recording was performed by the Sinfonia of London and conducted by Bruce Broughton.

See also
 List of historical drama films
 List of films set in ancient Rome
 Julius Caesar (1950 film)
 Julius Caesar (1970 film)

References

External links

 
 
 
 
 Julius Caesar at Box Office Mojo
 Julius Caesar at TV Guide (1987 write-up was originally published in The Motion Picture Guide'')

1953 films
1953 drama films
1950s historical drama films
American black-and-white films
American epic films
American historical drama films
Films based on Julius Caesar (play)
Films directed by Joseph L. Mankiewicz
Films whose art director won the Best Art Direction Academy Award
Golden Leopard winners
Metro-Goldwyn-Mayer films
Films scored by Miklós Rózsa
Films set in ancient Rome
Films set in the 1st century BC
Films with screenplays by Joseph L. Mankiewicz
Films shot in Los Angeles County, California
Depictions of Augustus on film
Cultural depictions of Cicero
Cultural depictions of Julius Caesar
Cultural depictions of Marcus Junius Brutus
Cultural depictions of Mark Antony
1950s English-language films
1950s American films